Minimisation or minimization is a type of deception involving denial coupled with rationalisation/rationalization in situations where complete denial is implausible. It is the opposite of exaggeration.
Minimisation, or downplaying the significance of an event or emotion, is a common strategy in dealing with feelings of guilt. Words associated with minimisation include:

Manipulative abuse

Minimisation may take the form of a manipulative technique:
 observed in abusers and manipulators to downplay their misdemeanors when confronted with irrefutable facts.
 observed in abusers and manipulators to downplay positive attributes (talents and skills etc.) of their victims.

Typical psychological defences exhibited by stalkers and guilty criminal suspects include denial, rationalisation, minimisation and projection of blame onto the victim.

A variation on minimisation as a manipulative technique is "claiming altruistic motives" such as saying "I don't do this because I am selfish, and for gain, but because I am a socially aware person interested in the common good".

Cognitive distortion
Minimisation may also take the form of cognitive distortion:
 that avoids acknowledging and dealing with negative emotions by reducing the importance and impact of events that give rise to those emotions.
 that avoids conscious confrontation with the negative impacts of one's behavior on others by reducing the perception of such impacts.
 that avoids interpersonal confrontation by reducing the perception of the impact of others' behavior on oneself.

Examples
 saying that a taunt or insult was only a joke
 a customer receiving a response to a complaint to a company for poor service being told that complaints like his from other customers were very rare when in fact they are common
 suggesting that there are just a few bad apples or rogues in an organisation when in reality problems are widespread and systemic
 Your boss may redirect you instead of rejecting you in a subtle way (with or without factual evidence)

School bullying sometimes minimised as a prank
School bullying is one form of victimisation or physical abuse which has sometimes been unofficially encouraged, ritualised or even minimised as a sort of prank by teachers or peers. The main difference between pranks and bullying is establishment of power inequity between the bully and the victim that lasts beyond the duration of the act.

Understatements

Understatement is a form of speech which contains an expression of less strength than what would be expected. Understatement is a staple of humour in English-speaking cultures, especially in British humour. In this humorous form, the understatement is expected to not be interpreted literally.

Related but separate is euphemism, where a polite phrase is used in place of a harsher or more offensive expression.

Self-esteem/depression
Redefining events to downplay their significance can be an effective way of preserving one's self-esteem.  One of the problems of depression (found in those with clinical, bipolar, and chronic depressive mood disorders, as well as cyclothymia) is the tendency to do the reverse: minimising the positive, discounting praise, and dismissing one's own accomplishments. On the other hand, one technique used by Alfred Adler to combat neurosis was to minimise the excessive significance the neurotic attaches to his own symptoms—the narcissistic gains derived from pride in one's own illness.

Social minimisation
Display rules expressing a group's general consensus about the display of feeling often involve minimising the amount of emotion one displays, as with a poker face. Social interchanges involving minor infringements often end with the 'victim' minimising the offence with a comment like 'Think nothing of it',  using so-called 'reduction words', such as 'no big deal,' 'only a little,' 'merely,' or 'just', the latter particularly useful in denying intent. On a wider scale, renaming things in a more benign or neutral form—'collateral damage' for death—is a form of minimisation.

Literary analogues
A scene in the film Monty Python and the Holy Grail involving the Black Knight character, demonstrates an absurd level of minimisation. For example, the knight's response to his having his left arm severed is "It's just a flesh wound." Compare with the Monty Python Dirty Fork sketch, which is the opposite extreme of absurdity (catastrophisation).

See also

References

Further reading
 Henning, K & Holdford, R  Minimization, Denial, and Victim Blaming by Batterers Criminal Justice and Behavior, Vol. 33, No. 1, 110–130 (2006)
 Rogers, Richard & Dickey, Rob (March 1991) Denial and minimization among sex offenders Journal Sexual Abuse Vol 4, No 1: 49–63
 Scott K Denial, Minimization, Partner Blaming, and Intimate Aggression in Dating Partners Journal of Interpersonal Violence, Vol. 22, No. 7, 851–871 (2007)

Defence mechanisms
Cognitive biases
Error
Public relations techniques